The 1970 Hamilton Tiger-Cats season was the 13th season for the team in the Canadian Football League and their 21st overall. The Tiger-Cats finished in 1st place in the Eastern Conference with an 8–5–1 record, but lost the Eastern Finals to the Montreal Alouettes.

Roster

Regular season

Season standings

Season schedule

Post-season

Awards and honours
Tommy Joe Coffey, CFL All-Star
Angelo Mosca, CFL All-Star

References

Hamilton Tiger-cats Season, 1970
Hamilton Tiger-Cats seasons